Next Stop Wonderland is a 1998 American romantic comedy film directed by Brad Anderson, written by Anderson and Lyn Vaus, and starring Hope Davis and Alan Gelfant. It premiered at the Sundance Film Festival on January 17, 1998, where it was nominated for a Grand Jury Prize.

Plot
Two people live unlucky in love in Boston: Erin, whose activist boyfriend Sean has just walked out on their relationship to help a Native American tribe fight off a land development deal, and Alan, a plumber struggling to pay off family obligations while pursuing a career as a marine biologist. Both deal with personal and professional problems and stumble through relationships, continually crossing one another's paths without ever truly meeting and realizing how perfect they are for one another. Time and time again one almost catches the other's eye, but circumstances intervene. After a series of ups and downs  both of their budding relationships with others crash and burn, just in time for a chance meeting on the MBTA train (the Blue Line) heading to Wonderland station in Revere, Massachusetts, on the outskirts of Boston.

Cast
Hope Davis as Erin Castleton
Alan Gelfant as Alan Monteiro
Philip Seymour Hoffman as Sean
Cara Buono as Julie
José Zúñiga as Andre de Silva
Sam Seder as Kevin Monteiro
Callie Thorne as Cricket
Jimmy Tingle as bartender
Holland Taylor as Piper Castleton
Robert Klein as Arty Lesser
H. Jon Benjamin as Eric
Frank L. Ridley as whale watch captain (voice)
Lawrence Gilliard Jr. as Brett

Release
The film, which cost $1 million to make, was an audience favorite at the Sundance Film Festival in 1998. A bidding war among studio distributors resulted in Miramax Films paying $6 million for the film's North American distribution rights. The film grossed only $3.3 million during its theatrical release.

Soundtrack
The film's soundtrack is scored by Claudio Ragazzi with various renditions by Vinicius Cantuaria, Arto Lindsay, and Bebel Gilberto. It was released on Verve Records.

Reception
On review aggregator Rotten Tomatoes, the film holds an approval rating of 73%, based on 45 reviews, and an average rating of 6.8/10. The website's critical consensus reads, "Endearing performances create characters you care about". On Metacritic, the film has a score of 71 out of a 100 based on reviews from 19 critics, indicating "generally favorable reviews".

Rita Kempley of The Washington Post wrote: "It's the individual characters, so carefully crafted, who count, as opposed to a tidy conclusion". Varietys Todd McCarthy wrote that Next Stop Wonderland is "Low on plot but high on charm and personality", adding that "[it']s a sly, hand-crafted indie that is very alive and attentive to its characters' feelings and foibles". Stephen Holden of The New York Times said that "Next Stop Wonderland isn't really much more than a beautifully acted, finely edited sitcom, but it creates and sustains an intelligent, seriocomic mood better than any recent film about the urban single life".

References

Bibliography
Gerson, Lisa, Boston magazine, July 1998. (archived 1999)

External links

Bernieri, Laura, Robbins Entertainment Co. (archived 1999)

1998 romantic comedy-drama films
American independent films
American romantic comedy-drama films
Films directed by Brad Anderson
Films set in Boston
Films set in Massachusetts
Films shot in Massachusetts
Rail transport films
1998 independent films
1990s English-language films
1990s American films